Wutungurra is a small community in the Northern Territory of Australia. It has a population of 166 (2016 Census) and is on the country of the Alyawarr people.

Notes

External links
 Wutungurra (Barkly Regional Council)

Aboriginal communities in the Northern Territory